The Tiourarén Formation is a geological formation in the Agadez Region of Niger whose strata were originally thought to be Early Cretaceous. However, re-interpretation of the sediments showed that they are probably Middle Jurassic (Bathonian) in age. It is the uppermost unit of the Irhazer Group. Dinosaur remains are among the fossils that have been recovered from the formation.

Description 
The formation comprises reddish, almost solid mudstones, which also shows grey and white streaks, probably caused by alternating oxidative and reducing environments. The depositional environment has been interpreted as swampy with seasonal flooding in braided river systems.

Fossil content

See also 
 List of dinosaur-bearing rock formations
 Lists of fossiliferous stratigraphic units in Africa
 List of fossiliferous stratigraphic units in Niger
 Geology of Niger

References

Further reading 
 A. F. d. Lapparent. 1960. Les Dinosauriens du "Continental intercalaire" du Saharal central [The dinosaurs of the "Continental Intercalaire" of the central Sahara]. Mémoires de la Société géologique de France, nouvelle série 39(88A):1-57
 P. C. Sereno, A. L. Beck, D. B. Dutheil, H. C. E. Larsson, G. H. Lyon, B. Moussa, R. W. Sadleir, C. A. Sidor, D. J. Varricchio, G. P. Wilson, and J. A. Wilson. 1999. Cretaceous sauropods from the Sahara and the uneven rate of skeletal evolution among dinosaurs. Science 286:1342-1347
 P. C. Sereno, J. A. Wilson, H. C. E. Larsson, D. B. Dutheil, and H.-D. Sues. 1994. Early Cretaceous dinosaurs from the Sahara. Science 266(5183):267-271
 F. Witzmann, O. Hampe, B. M. Rothschild, U. Joger, R. Kosma, D. Schwarz, and P. Asbach. 2016. Subchondral cysts at synovial vertebral joints as analogies of Schmorl's Nodes in a sauropod dinosaur from Niger. Journal of Vertebrate Paleontology 36(2):e1080719:1-11

Geologic formations of Niger
Mesozoic Niger
Jurassic System of Africa
Middle Jurassic Africa
Bathonian Stage
Oxfordian Stage
Siltstone formations
Mudstone formations
Fluvial deposits
Paludal deposits
Paleontology in Niger
Formations